Atromitos Palama Football Club is a Greek football club based in Palamas, Karditsa, Greece.

Honors

Domestic

 Karditsa FCA Champions: 10
 1970–71, 1971–72, 1972–73, 1974–75, 1981–82, 1984–85, 1991–92, 1995–96, 2014–15, 2018-19
 Karditsa FCA Cup Winners: 6
 1978–79, 1982–83, 1992–93, 1995–96, 1996–97, 2019-20
 Karditsa FCA Super Cup Winners: 1
 2015

References

Karditsa
Association football clubs established in 1952
1952 establishments in Greece
Gamma Ethniki clubs